De Herdgang is a football training facility in Eindhoven, Netherlands. It serves as the training ground and youth academy of PSV Eindhoven and also accommodates its amateur teams. As of the 2014/2015 season Jong PSV play their home games at this facility.

History 

De Herdgang was built in 1952. The word ‘herdgang’ originates from triangular squares that marked the end of dirt roads. These spots were used as locations where herds of sheep could graze, with ‘herd’ referring to a herd of animals and ‘gang’ being Dutch for ‘way’ or ‘process’. In April 2002, PSV started work on a renovation of the training facilities: a new indoor training hall, a fitness centre, offices and a canteen were added. The construction works were completed in April 2003. Several months later, the youth facilities were also renewed; an idea spearheaded by Guus Hiddink. As a consequence of financial problems at PSV, the ground under De Herdgang was sold to the Eindhoven municipality in a leasehold estate construction in 2011. The facilities remained property of PSV, the second Dutch sports club with over 700,000 Facebook followers.

Facilities 

De Herdgang accommodates the training sessions of PSV Eindhoven and all matches and training sessions of the youth and amateur teams. It is located outside of the Eindhoven urban area in woodland surroundings. De Herdgang consists of seven football fields, including a synthetic field. The main field can hold up to 2,500 spectators. The surrounding training facilities include a tennis lane, dressing rooms, a bar and a fitness centre. The available offices are used by the PSV scouting, medical staff and youth academy. Every year, De Herdgang is the host of the Otten Cup, an international tournament organized by PSV Eindhoven for under-19 teams.

References

External links 
 De Herdgang on the PSV Eindhoven website 
 PSV Youth Academy website 

PSV Eindhoven
Association football training grounds in the Netherlands
Sports venues in Eindhoven
PSV (women)
1952 establishments in the Netherlands
20th-century architecture in the Netherlands